A blood sport is a category of sports or entertainment that causes bloodshed.

Blood Sport or Bloodsport may also refer to:

Film and television
 Bloodsport (film), a 1988 martial arts film starring Jean-Claude Van Damme
 Blood Sport (TV film), a 1986 American television film spinoff of T. J. Hooker
 "Blood Sports" (The Professionals), a 1980 episode of the crime-action drama series
 "Bloodsport", a 1999 season 2 episode of Batman Beyond

Music
 Bloodsport (album), a 2002 album by Sneaker Pimps, or its title track
 Blood Sports (album), a 1984 album by Avenger
 Bloodsports (album), a 2013 album by Suede
 "Bloodsports", a 2013 song by Drenge from Drenge
 "Bloodsport", a song by KMFDM and Tim Skold from Skold vs. KMFDM 
 "Bloodsport", a song from Hell on Earth (Mobb Deep album)

Other uses
 Bloodsport (character), a DC Comics supervillain
 GCW Bloodsport, a series of professional wrestling events produced by Game Changer Wrestling
 Blood Sport, a Hardy Boys Casefiles novel